Route Availability (RA) is the system by which the permanent way and supporting works (bridges, embankments, etc.) of the railway network of Great Britain are graded. All routes are allocated an RA number between 1 and 10.

Rolling stock is also allocated an RA (again between 1 and 10) and the RA of a train is the highest RA of any of its elements. The train must have a route availability (RA) lower than or equal to the RA of a line to be allowed to use it. The RA is primarily related to the axle load of the vehicle, although axle spacing is also taken into consideration. In practice it is the locomotive which governs where trains may operate, although many high capacity 4 axle wagons have high RAs when fully loaded. (When considering the operation of trains the loading gauge must also be considered.)

The system was first devised by the London and North Eastern Railway, and perpetuated by British Rail to ascertain which locomotives can work on which lines throughout the rail network in Great Britain.

Exemptions may be obtained to allow locomotives to operate on lines from which they may otherwise be banned. An exemption might be granted by placing a speed restriction over a weak bridge, for example.

Line calculations 
The route availability for a line is calculated by taking into account bridge strength, track condition, structural issues and so on.  A route availability of one (RA1) is the most restricted line, open to possibly one type of locomotive specially designed for it.  A route availability of 10 is the most open, usable by any locomotive that fits within the GB loading gauge that has been 'passed' for it (checked for conflicts with infrastructure such as platforms).

Vehicle calculations 

Route availability for a vehicle (locomotive or wagon) is generally based upon its axle loading. That is, how much of the laden weight of the vehicle is distributed on each axle. The more weight on each axle, the higher the RA number, and the more restricted the vehicle is. The uneven weight distribution of the class 28 Co-Bo forced the use of a six-wheel bogie at one end in order to stay within RA 8. For wagons it is normal to have different RAs when running empty and full.

The RA of a locomotive must not exceed the RA of the track except under strictly controlled circumstances.

Thus a locomotive with RA 1 is able to work on any line, although it will have a very light axle loading (which will limit its capabilities, for example class 01 shunters are RA 1). An RA 10 locomotive could only work upon an RA 10 line, placing severe restrictions on where it can be used.

If a vehicle has wheels that require significant balance weights, often found on steam locomotives, the dynamic loading resulting in what is termed the hammer blow action may affect the RA of the vehicle.

Network Rail currently gives the allowed axle loadings as follows:

The information regarding route availability (RA) in this article comes from the British Rail (London Midland Region) Route Availability Guide and the Freight Train Loads Book, both issued in 1969. Several routes will have had their RA numbers changed since that time. 

* Depending on sub-class, see individual article for details.

$ Discrepancy with original data.

Historical notes

Before nationalisation the Big Four railway companies had their own classification systems.

Great Western Railway

Each locomotive had a coloured disc painted on the cab side to indicate its route availability:

See also
 Rail speed limits in the United States#Track classes

References

External links
British Railways Board Group Standard for Route Availability (historical)
Network Rail infrastructure capacity
 2D53 Introduction to Route Availability and tables
 Network Rail Information
 GE/RT8006 Assessment of Compatibility of Rail Vehicle Weights and Underline Bridges (live issues) at RGS Online

Permanent way
Rail infrastructure in the United Kingdom
London and North Eastern Railway
British Rail numbering and classification systems